Hurleyella is a genus of small flies in the family Dolichopodidae from the Nearctic and Neotropical realms. They belong to the "micro-dolichopodids", a group of probably unrelated genera from the New World which have a body length of 1 mm or less. The subfamily placement of this genus is currently uncertain, though in some aspects the genus fits into Medeterinae. The genus is named after the late dipterist Richard Hurley.

Species 
 Hurleyella belizensis Runyon, 2019
 Hurleyella brooksi Runyon & Robinson, 2010
 Hurleyella cumberlandensis Runyon & Robinson, 2010
 Hurleyella salina Runyon, 2019

References 

Dolichopodidae genera
Dolichopodidae
Diptera of North America
Taxa named by Harold E. Robinson